The Tri-River Athletic Conference (TRAC) is a high school athletic league that is part of the CIF Central Section. All of the members are major public high schools in Fresno County, California. The name derives from the three major rivers found in the Central Valley: the Fresno, Kings, and San Joaquin Rivers.

TRAC Football History 
The Tri-River Athletic Conference was formed before the 1996-97 school year when the Central Section broke up the Northeast and Northwest Yosemite Leagues, in large part due to Fresno Unified schools not being able to compete with the Clovis Unified juggernaut. Original members of the TRAC include: Buchanan, Central, Clovis, Clovis West, Madera, and Sanger. 

For two seasons (2002 and 2003), the TRAC was split up into two separate conferences, the Tri-River and Tri-City. The Tri-River consisted of Central, Clovis, Clovis East, and Hoover. Meanwhile, the Tri-City was made up by Buchanan, Bullard, Clovis West, and Madera.  

 Buchanan has seven TRAC championships to their name, with the first coming in 1997.

Central is the first team to win back-to-back outright TRAC titles. Central's first TRAC championship came in the form of a 3-way tie with Clovis and Clovis West back in 2001.

 Clovis won the first ever TRAC title in 1996 after going 5-0 in conference play. Clovis has racked up seven TRAC titles in all, including three since 2011 under current head coach Rich Hammond. When Hammond led Clovis to a co-championship in 2011, he ended the Cougars worst drought in their history. Clovis had never gone more than five years without a conference title since 1970.

 Clovis East's rise into a section powerhouse was unprecedented. In the T-Wolves first season playing varsity football (2001), the school met Liberty in the D-III title game, eventually falling 25-13. Joining their Clovis brethren in D-I the following year, Clovis East would win six TRAC titles from 2002-2008. The Timberwolves are restoring pride to their once proud program after going 0-40 in TRAC play from 2010-2017.

 Clovis North is the newest member of the TRAC, joining in 2011. The Broncos have won two titles, both coming in 2013 and 2014.

 Clovis West has the honor of holding the title of most TRAC championships. Since 1998, Clovis West has won ten conference titles. However, two of those ten were won in the Tri-City Athletic Conference.

Members 

*Clovis North's first Valley championship was won in D-II

Football Championships by Year 
A TRAC championship is won by the team with the best league record at the end of the regular season. A championship can be shared by multiple teams, commonly referred to as a co-championship, if they have the same league record at the end of the regular season.

*denotes record after regular season

Football Championships by School (All-time)

References

CIF Central Section